The following highways are numbered 320:

Canada
 Newfoundland and Labrador Route 320
 Nova Scotia Route 320
 Saskatchewan Highway 320

China
 China National Highway 320

Costa Rica
 National Route 320

India
 National Highway 320 (India)

Japan
 Japan National Route 320

United States
  U.S. Route 320 (former)
  Arkansas Highway 320
  Connecticut Route 320
  Florida State Road 320
  County Road 320 (Florida)
  Georgia State Route 320
  Hawaii Route 320
  Kentucky Route 320
  Louisiana Highway 320
  Maryland Route 320
  Montana Secondary Highway 320
  Nevada State Route 320
  New Mexico State Road 320
  New York State Route 320
  Ohio State Route 320
  Pennsylvania Route 320
  Puerto Rico Highway 320
  Tennessee State Route 320
 Texas:
  Texas State Highway 320
  Texas State Highway Loop 320 (former)
  Farm to Market Road 320
  Utah State Route 320
  Virginia State Route 320
  Wyoming Highway 320